Ørjar Øyen (born 19 February 1927) is a Norwegian sociologist.

Øyen was born in Brønnøy to schoolteacher Torvald Øyen and Helga Karijord. He was married to sociologist Else Øyen from 1957 to 1988, and to professor Bente Gullveig Alver from 1996. He was appointed professor in sociology at the University of Bergen from 1968 to 1997. He served as rector of the university from 1978 to 1983. He was decorated Commander of the Order of St. Olav in 1988.

References

1927 births
Possibly living people
People from Brønnøy
Norwegian sociologists
Academic staff of the University of Bergen
Rectors of the University of Bergen